The Lee Weaver House is a historic house at the northwest corner of Main and Cope Streets in Hardy, Arkansas.  Built 1924–26, this -story stone structure is a fine local example of the Bungalow style.  It is fashioned out of native rough-cut stone, joined with beveled mortar.  It has a side gable roof with a shallow pitch, and extended eaves with exposed rafter ends and knee braces.  A wide gable-roof dormer with three sash windows pierces the front slope.  The roof shelters a front porch supported by tapered square columns.

The house was listed on the National Register of Historic Places in 1998.

See also
National Register of Historic Places listings in Sharp County, Arkansas

References

Houses on the National Register of Historic Places in Arkansas
Houses completed in 1926
Houses in Sharp County, Arkansas
National Register of Historic Places in Sharp County, Arkansas